The Finnish football league system is a series of interconnected leagues for club football in Finland. The three highest levels are managed by the Finnish FA while the other leagues are managed by the regional departments of the FA.

System
As of the 2017 season. 7th level (Kutonen) is played 2x35 minutes in Helsinki, 8th level (Seiska) 2x30 minutes in Helsinki and 2x40 minutes in Tampere.

Cup competitions

Clubs at all levels are eligible for Finnish Cup. Clubs of Kolmonen and below are eligible to compete in Regions' Cup.

Finnish League Cup was a cup competition for top tier clubs played during winter months before the start of the league season. It was replaced in 2017 by Finnish Cup group stage.

External links 
 Finnish FA 
  League321.com - Finnish football league tables, records & statistics database. 
  Finlandfootball.net - Football Archive of Finnish football with league tables and cup results. 
flashscore - Football Finnish league - Finland Live Scores, Results.

Finland